In questo mondo di ladri (English: In this world of thieves) is an album by Italian musician Antonello Venditti. It was released in 1988 by Heinz Music to commercial success, reaching no.1 on the Italian charts and selling more than 1.5 million copies, making it one of the best selling albums in Italy of all time. The title track, "In questo mondo di ladri", was featured in the 2004 comedy of the same name.

Track listing

See also
 List of best-selling albums in Italy

References

Antonello Venditti albums
1988 albums
Italian-language albums